Davina Reichman is an Australian business consultant who launched fashion shows and iPad accessories.

Education
Reichman graduated in 2003 from the University of Sydney with a Bachelor of Computer Science and in 2006 earned an MBA at the University of Technology, Sydney.

Career
In 2009, claiming consumers should get more for their money, she attended a fashion show in Sydney with an outfit made from a roll of bubble wrap. In 2010, founder and Managing Director Reichman organized an annual fashion show, Being Born Again Couture, to create one-off bespoke couture garments.

The same year, she founded and became the managing director of iClothing, described as "the world's first iPad compatible clothes". The iDress and the iTee have a padded pouch designed to store the iPad.

In 2012, Reichman founded and is the CEO of NYC Fashion Runway, a series of fashion shows for independent and celebrity fashion designers to showcase their collections in NYC and Sydney, offering publicity, buyers and press including CNN, NY Daily News, Fashion TV, The Examiner, Fashion Avenue News.
The company has produced shows in venues including the Empire State Building, Copacabana, the Gansevoort Park Avenue Hotel and the Dream Hotel.

Reichman was featured on the cover of Focus of New York Magazine and the feature article for their Jan/Feb 2014 issue.

Reichman is featured on the "Entrepreneurs to Watch" list of Raine Magazine.

References

External links
NYC Fashion Runway website
Being Born Again Couture Fashion Show website
iClothing website

Living people
University of Sydney alumni
University of Technology Sydney alumni
Australian businesspeople in fashion
Year of birth missing (living people)
Australian women company founders
Australian company founders